Bernard Bienvenu (30 November 1920 – 13 July 1993) was a French footballer. He competed in the men's tournament at the 1948 Summer Olympics.

References

External links
 
 

1920 births
1993 deaths
French footballers
Olympic footballers of France
Footballers at the 1948 Summer Olympics
Place of birth missing
Association football defenders
Stade Français (association football) players